Sıtkı Yırcalı (1908–1988) was a Turkish jurist and politician who served in various cabinet posts during the period between 1950 and 1958. He was a member of the Democrat Party and then of the Justice Party.

Early life and education
Yırcalı was born in Balıkesir on 13 September 1908. He hailed from a well-known family, and his father, Yırcalızade  Şükrü, was a member of the Committee of Union and Progress who was active in its local branch. Sıtkı graduated from Kabataş Erkek Lisesi in 1928. He received a bachelor's degree in law from Istanbul University and a PhD in law from the University of Paris.

Career
Following his graduation Yırcalı worked as a lawyer in his hometown. He joined the Democrat Party in 1946 and became its head in Balıkesir. He was elected to the Parliament in 1950 and served there for three terms. In the cabinets led by Prime Minister Adnan Menderes Yırcalı held the following cabinet posts:  minister  of  customs  and  monopolies  (1951–1952), minister of industry (1952–1954; 1958), minister of economy (1954–1955) and minister of press and tourism (1957–1958). He resigned from office while serving as minister of industry 1958. 

From 1957 to 1960 Yırcalı was among the Democrat Party members who opposed the hegemony of the founders of the party, including Adnan Menderes. The group was consisted of 150 party members and headed by him. 

Yırcalı was arrested after the military coup on 27 May 1960 and jailed in Yassıada for a while. He continued to work as a lawyer and was elected as a senator for the Justice Party in 1975.

Personal life and death
Yırcalı was married and had a son and a daughter. His younger brother, Sırrı, was also a lawyer and a politician from the Democrat Party who was a member of the Parliament between 1954 and 1960.

Sıtkı Yırcalı died in Ankara on 29 September 1988 and was buried in Cebeci cemetery.

References

20th-century Turkish lawyers
1908 births
1988 deaths
Burials at Cebeci Asri Cemetery
Democrat Party (Turkey, 1946–1961) politicians
Deputies of Balıkesir
Industry ministers of Turkey
Istanbul University Faculty of Law alumni
Justice Party (Turkey) politicians
Ministers of Economic Affairs of Turkey
Members of the 20th government of Turkey
Members of the 21st government of Turkey
Members of the 23rd government of Turkey
Members of the 9th Parliament of Turkey
Members of the 10th Parliament of Turkey
Members of the 11th Parliament of Turkey
Members of the Senate of the Republic (Turkey)
Ministers of Tourism of Turkey
People from Balıkesir
Politicians arrested in Turkey
Turkish prisoners and detainees
University of Paris alumni
Kabataş Erkek Lisesi alumni